The Portraits of Periodical Offering were tributary documentative paintings (with illustration on each of the portrait) produced by various Chinese dynasties and later as well in other East Asian dynasties, such as Japan and Vietnam. These paintings were official historical documents by the imperial courts. The term "" roughly translates to "duty offering pictorial". Throughout Chinese history, tributary states and tribes were required to send ambassadors to the imperial court periodically and pay tribute with valuable gifts (gòngpǐn).

Drawings and paintings with short descriptions were used to record the expression of these ambassadors and to a lesser extent to show the cultural aspects of these ethnic groups. These historical descriptions beside the portrait became the equivalent of documents of diplomatic relations with each country. The drawings were reproduced in woodblock printing after the 9th century and distributed among the bureaucracy in albums. The Portraits of Periodical Offering of Imperial Qing by Xie Sui, completed in 1751, gives verbal descriptions of outlying tribes as far as the island of Britain in Western Europe.

Portraits of Periodical Offering of Liang (526–539 CE)
The Portraits of Periodical Offering of Liang was painted by the future Emperor Yuan of Liang, Xiao Yi (ruled 552–555 CE) of the Liang dynasty while he was a Governor of the Province of Jingzhou as a young man between 526 and 539 CE, a post he held again between 547 and 552 CE, and had the opportunity to meet many foreigners. It is the earliest surviving of these specially significant paintings. They reflect foreign embassies that took place, particularly regarding the three Hephthalite (Hua) ambassadors, in 516–520 CE. The original of the work was lost, but three copies or derived works are known.

Portraits of Periodical Offering of Liang (526–539 CE) (Song dynasty copy of the 11th century CE)
A surviving edition of this work is a copy from the Song dynasty in the 11th century, the Song copy of the Portraits of Periodical Offering of Liang, and is currently preserved at the National Museum of China. The original work consisted of at least twenty five portraits of ambassadors from their various countries. The copy from the Song dynasty has twelve portraits and descriptions of thirteen envoys; the envoy from Dangchang has no portrait. The work included individual descriptions, which follow closely the dynastic chronicle Liangshu (Volume 54).

The envoys from right to left were: the Hephthalites, Persia, Korea, Kucha, Japan, Malaysia, Qiang, Yarkand, Kabadiyan, Kumedh, Balkh, and finally Merv.

The remaining countries, now lost, are thought to have been: Gaojuli  (Goguryeo), Yutian  (Hotan in Xinjiang), Xinluo  (Silla), Kepantuo  (Tashkurgan  in present-day Xinjiang), Wuxing fan  (in Shanxi), Gaochang  (Turpan), Tianmen Man  (somewhere between Henan, Hubei, and Guizhou), Dan 蜑 Barbarians of Jianping  (between Hubei and Sichuan), and Man 蠻 Barbarians of Linjiang  (East Sichuan). There may also have been: Zhongtianzhu , Bei tianzhu  (India), and Shiziguo  (Sri Lanka), for a total of twenty-five countries.

Individual portraits
Some of the main portraits are:

Tang dynasty The Gathering of Kings (circa 650 CE)
A Tang period painting consisting in a version of the Liang portraits of Periodical Offerings, entitled The Gathering of Kings (Wanghuitu). It was probably made by Yan Liben (601–673 CE). From right to left, the countries are Lu (魯國) which is a reference to the Eastern Wei , Rouran, Persia, Baekje, Kumedh, Baiti, Merv, Central India, Sri Lanka, Northern India, Tashkurgan, Wuxing City of the Chouchi (武興國), Kucha (龜茲國), Japan, Goguryeo, Khotan, Silla, Dangchang, Langkasuka, Dengzhi, Yarkand, Kabadiyan, Barbarians of Jianping, Nudan. See the complete Wanghuitu.

Individual portraits
Some of the main portraits are:

Southern Tang Entrance of the Foreign Visitors (10th century CE)
Emperor Yuan of Liang, Xiao Yi (552-555 CE) made another painting entitled "Entrance of the Foreign Visitors", now lost. A copy named "Entrance of the Foreign Visitors of Emperor Yuan of Liang" was made by the painter Gu Deqian of the Southern Tang dynasty (937–976 CE), native of Jiangsu. From right to left, the countries are Lu (魯國) which is a reference to the Eastern Wei, Rouran (芮芮國), Tuyuhun, Central India, Western Wei , Champa, Sri Lanka, Northern India, Tashkurgan, Wuxing City of the Chouchi, Dangchang, Langkasuka, Dengzhi, Persia, Baekje, Kucha, Japan, Yarkand, Khotan, Silla, Kantoli, Funan.

Portraits of Periodical Offering of Tang (Song dynasty copy, 11–13th century)
The Portraits of Periodical Offering of Tang by painter Yan Liben, depicting foreign envoys with tribute bearers for the Tang dynasty arriving at Chang'an in 631, during the reign of the Emperor Taizong of Tang. The painting consists of 27 people from various states. The original work was lost, and the only surviving edition was a Song dynasty copy, which is currently preserved at the National Palace Museum in Taipei.

Portraits of Periodical Offering (Qing dynasty, 18th century)
In the mid-18th century, the painter Xiesui again painted a Portraits of Periodical Offering of the Imperial Qing (Huángqīng Zhígòngtú , completed in 1751), showing various foreign people known at that time, with texts in Chinese and Manchu. See the complete Huangqing Zhigongtu.

Related works

See also
 Foreign relations of imperial China
 Tributary system of China
 List of tributary states of China
 Twenty-Four Histories
 Chinese historiography
 Monarchy of China
 Pax Sinica
 Zongli Yamen

References

Notes

External links
Picture of Liang Chih-kung-t'u
Chinese Calligraphy And Painting Artist Network: Xiao Yi (Chinese)

Foreign relations of Imperial China
Tributaries of Imperial China
Chinese paintings
Chinese iconography